Charles Marsh Thomson (February 13, 1877 – December 30, 1943) was a lawyer, judge and U.S. Representative from Illinois.

Biography
Born in Chicago, Illinois, Thomson attended public schools and the Chicago Manual Training School. He graduated from Washington & Jefferson College, Washington, Pennsylvania, in 1899 and from Northwestern University School of Law, Evanston, Illinois, in 1902. He was admitted to the bar association that year and began practicing law in Chicago.

He served on the Chicago City Council as an alderman from the 25th ward from 1908 through 1912. Thomson was elected to this position in 1908, 1910, and 1912.

He was elected as a Progressive to the 63rd Congress, where he served from March 4, 1913, to March 3, 1915. He was an unsuccessful candidate for reelection to the 64th Congress in 1914.

Thompson was originally going to run for mayor of Chicago in 1915 as a progressive. However, after William Hale Thompson entered the race as a Republican, Charles M. Thomson withdrew. William Hale Thompson was elected, and in turn supported Thomson's subsequent candidacy for the Circuit Court of Cook County later that year.

Thomson was elected judge of the circuit court of Cook County in 1915, and reelected in 1921. He was appointed justice of the Illinois Appellate Court in 1917, and reappointed in 1921. He served in this capacity until June 1927, then resumed his law practice in Chicago.

Thomson at one point was president of the Chicago Bar Association.

He was a trustee of the Chicago and Eastern Illinois Railroad from 1933 to 1939, when he was appointed trustee of the Chicago & North Western Railway. He served as trustee until his death on December 30, 1943. Thomson was interred in Chicago's Rosehill Cemetery.

References

1877 births
1943 deaths
Lawyers from Chicago
Progressive Party (1912) members of the United States House of Representatives from Illinois
Judges of the Illinois Appellate Court
Washington & Jefferson College alumni
Northwestern University Pritzker School of Law alumni
Burials at Rosehill Cemetery
Judges of the Circuit Court of Cook County (pre-1964 reorganization)
Chicago City Council members